The Tyranny of Will is the second studio album by American crossover thrash band Iron Reagan. Released in September 2014, it was their first under the Relapse Records label and the first to feature bassist Rob Skotis.

Recording and release
The Tyranny of Will was recorded from February to April 2014 at Blaze of Torment Studios in Richmond, Virginia and mixed at Kurt Ballou at GodCity Studio in Salem, Massachusetts. It was announced in March that the band had signed with Relapse Records, and, when their Spoiled Identity EP was released weeks later, the tracks "The Living Skull" and "Your Kid's an Asshole" were included. On July 9, the track "Miserable Failure" was released as a single through SoundCloud. The full album was released on September 16, 2014 on compact disc, LP, cassette, and via digital download and streaming.

Track listing

Personnel
Iron Reagan
Tony Foresta – vocals
Mark Bronzino – guitar
Phil Hall – guitar
Rob Skotis – bass guitar
Ryan Parrish – drums

Guest vocalists
Luna Duran (on "Consensual Harassment")

Production
Produced by Phil Hall
Mixed by Kurt Ballou
Mastered by Brad Boatright
Cover design by Orion Landau
Artwork by Alexis Mabry

Charts

References

External links
Official website

2014 albums
Iron Reagan albums
Relapse Records albums